The Osterman Weekend is a 1983 American suspense thriller film directed by Sam Peckinpah, based on the 1972 novel of the same name by Robert Ludlum. The film stars Rutger Hauer, John Hurt, Burt Lancaster, Dennis Hopper, Meg Foster, Helen Shaver, Chris Sarandon and Craig T. Nelson. It was Peckinpah's final film before his death in 1984.

Plot

CIA director Maxwell Danforth (Burt Lancaster) watches a recording of agent Laurence Fassett (John Hurt) and his wife having sex. When Fassett goes to the shower, two KGB assassins enter the bedroom and kill his wife. The CIA had in fact sanctioned her killing. Fassett, unaware of his employer's involvement, is consumed by grief and rage. He hunts the assassins, eventually uncovering a Soviet spy network known as Omega.

Fassett points to three men as the top Omega agents: Bernard Osterman (Craig T. Nelson), a television producer who knows martial arts; Richard Tremayne (Dennis Hopper), a plastic surgeon; and stock trader Joseph Cardone (Chris Sarandon). Rather than arrest the three members, which would alarm the KGB, Fassett proposes to the CIA director that they turn one of them to the side of the West in order to unravel the entire network more efficiently. Fassett sees an opportunity in John Tanner (Rutger Hauer), a controversial television journalist who is highly critical of government abuses of power. Tanner has been close friends with the three men since all four were at Berkeley together, and Fassett believes Tanner can successfully turn one of them.

The CIA contacts Tanner and Fassett tells him that his closest friends are Omega agents. Although initially highly skeptical, Tanner becomes more convinced as Fassett shows him videotaped evidence of his friends talking with a Russian man, whom Fassett identifies as a KGB agent. In three different video clips, the Russian man discusses with Cardone the prospect of "targeting" Tanner, seeing him as a threat; Tremayne expresses his desire to leave the country when "it" goes down; Osterman talks about wanting to see "radical change" in the current system, but makes clear that he's only interested if paid handsomely, asking for a Swiss bank account. Tanner eventually agrees to try turning one of them at their annual reunion, which is coming up that weekend (these reunions are named "Ostermans", in honour of their initial sponsor), which this year is being held at Tanner's house; but only on the condition that Danforth, the CIA director, appear as a guest on his show. Danforth agrees to this condition.

Tanner's troubled marriage is not improved when he asks his wife, Ali (Meg Foster), to take their son out of town for the weekend so the two of them would miss the reunion. He does not want them involved but cannot tell her why, which upsets her. Fassett tells Tanner that his family is safer at home where the CIA can keep an eye on them, but Tanner disagrees. While driving his wife and son to the airport, their car is ambushed, and Ali and the child are kidnapped. With Fassett's intervention, they are rescued unhurt and the kidnapper is shot dead. In the meantime, Tanner's home has been wired with closed circuit video so Fassett can gather more evidence. Now that Ali is aware Tanner is involved in espionage activity (although not knowing the details), Tanner has her and their son stay at the house for the weekend. Fassett sets himself up in a large van on the grounds with a squad of CIA agents on the outskirts of Tanner's property.

Osterman, Tremayne and Cardone arrive for the weekend, each having recently encountered difficulties engineered by the CIA in order to unsettle them. Consequently, the mood is tense. On the second night, Fassett sends a video feed to Tanner's dining room television, showing a clip about Switzerland that focuses on Swiss bank accounts and illegal financial manipulation. Virginia, Tremayne's wife, becomes furious, and Ali punches her in the face. Osterman tells Tanner that he's getting himself into something out of his depth, and everyone retires to their rooms. Soon after, Tanner's son discovers the severed head of the family dog in the refrigerator, but it turns out to be fake. Tanner has had enough and demands that his guests leave. Tanner confronts Fassett and insists he arrest the suspects. Fassett sends an order to the CIA guards to kill Osterman.

Cardone and Tremayne and their wives escape in Tanner's RV. Tanner confronts Osterman and assaults him. Osterman easily overpowers him and demands an explanation. Tanner says that he knows that Osterman and his friends are Soviet agents. Osterman dismisses the accusation and explains that they have been illegally sheltering money in Swiss bank accounts to avoid taxation, but insists they are not traitors.

Fassett appears on the television and admits that he knows Osterman and his friends are only tax evaders. Fassett kills the Tremaynes and Cardones by remotely detonating an explosive device on the RV. He sends his soldiers into the house to kill Osterman and Tanner. Fassett taunts Tanner during the attack on the house, revealing that Danforth authorized his wife's murder. Fassett offers to release Tanner's family if Tanner will expose Danforth on television.

Sometime later, Danforth prepares for his remote interview with Tanner. Danforth is at his office and will speak into a camera and microphone crewed by the TV station. Tanner introduces Fassett on the air and Fassett, who is also being filmed remotely, exposes Danforth as a murderer. Danforth becomes enraged when he realizes that he has been tricked, publicly unleashing a paranoid diatribe and threatening Fassett with assassination. Fassett's remote location is a secret, but it is clear someone is coming for him. It is revealed that Tanner himself has pre-recorded his questions for both men with Osterman's assistance, and has used the video feed to locate Fassett, whom he shoots and kills. The angle from which Fassett's death is captured protects Tanner's anonymity, thereby appearing to confirm Danforth's threats in real time. Tanner then rescues his wife, his son, and his dog.

Cast

In addition, Merete Van Kamp makes a brief appearance as Fassett's wife, whose murder sets the plot in motion.

Production

William Castle initially purchased the film rights and asked author Ludlum to write the script. Ludlum was reluctant. Despite his extensive film and theatre experience, he said "I didn't leave that crowd of ocelots to go back into it."

As related in the documentary Alpha to Omega: Exposing The Osterman Weekend, producers Peter S. Davis and William N. Panzer were celebrating the wrapping of a film when they ran into Larry Jones. Jones, also a producer, revealed that he owned the film rights to Robert Ludlum's 1972 novel The Osterman Weekend, but was giving up on turning it into a feature film since he had not been able to develop a satisfactory screenplay. Davis and Panzer immediately offered to purchase the rights, as they felt this could be the project that elevated them out of the B-movie features that they had been financing up to that point. Jones and a partner agreed, and Davis and Panzer began pre-production.

The first order of business was to adapt Ludlum's complex story, and for this they hired Ian Masters. Davis claims that Masters followed conspiracy theories and closely paid attention to the CIA's activities throughout the world. After Masters developed the script's groundwork, Alan Sharp was hired to work on characters and dialogue.

With the screenplay completed they went looking for a director, and an offhand comment led them to Sam Peckinpah, the controversial and troubled man who had helmed The Wild Bunch (1969) and Straw Dogs (1971). Suffering from a damaged reputation due to alcohol and drug addiction (noted most recently on the set of his 1978 film Convoy), Peckinpah had been given the opportunity to do second unit work on Don Siegel's Jinxed! in 1981. The competence and professionalism he displayed made it possible for him to be considered as director of The Osterman Weekend.

Many studios did not want to work with Peckinpah because of his antagonistic relationship with producers. Additionally, the director's health was poor. Davis and Panzer were undaunted, because they felt that having Peckinpah's name attached to their film would lend it an air of respectability. Due to the director's damaged reputation, the producers were forced to seek financing from independent sources.

According to the commentators on the film's special edition DVD, Peckinpah hated Ludlum's novel and he did not like the screenplay either.  Peckinpah requested and was given permission to work on the script himself, but after submitting his first few pages the producers forbade him from any more rewrites.

In Marshall Fine's book Bloody Sam, screenwriter Sharp said that he himself did not like the screenplay he had written, and that he found it incredible that Davis and Panzer used his draft as the shooting script.  Fine also wrote that Ludlum had stated to his friend Jason Robards that he would provide a free rewrite; if this is true the producers never accepted his offer. In spite of his distaste for the project, Peckinpah immediately accepted the job as he was desperate to re-establish himself within the film community.

Multiple actors in Hollywood auditioned for the film, intrigued by the chance of working with the legendary director. Many of those who signed on, including John Hurt, Burt Lancaster and Dennis Hopper, did so for less than their usual salaries for an opportunity to work with Peckinpah. Rutger Hauer, fresh from the success of Blade Runner, was chosen by the producers for the lead role. For the film's primary location, the Tanner household, the filmmakers chose Robert Taylor's former residence in the Mandeville Canyon section of Los Angeles, the "Robert Taylor Ranch".

Peckinpah managed to keep up with the 54-day shooting schedule and within a budget of just under $7 million, but his relationship with the producers soon soured and he became combative.  The cast greatly respected him and said that Peckinpah put everything he could into directing the picture in spite of his physical exhaustion and health problems.

By the time shooting wrapped in January 1983, Peckinpah and the producers were hardly speaking. Peckinpah delivered the film on time and on budget, submitting his director's cut to the producers.

This version was screened once on May 25, 1983. Test audiences reacted unfavorably and many walked out of the theater during the first few minutes. Peckinpah opened with a distorted image of Fassett and his wife making love, and the way he had edited the scene made it difficult for the audience to discern what was going on.

Panzer and Davis were hoping that Peckinpah would re-edit the film himself because they did not desire to antagonize him any further, but the director refused to make changes. Peckinpah had also filmed several satirical scenes, subtly ridiculing the product. As a result, the producers felt they had no choice and effectively fired Peckinpah and re-edited the film themselves.

The producers changed the opening sequence and deleted other scenes they deemed unnecessary. Peckinpah proclaimed that producers had sabotaged his film, a complaint he also made after filming Major Dundee (1965) and Pat Garrett and Billy the Kid (1973).

Release and reception
The film was not a blockbuster, though it grossed $6 million domestically and did extremely well in Europe and on the new home-video market.  Theatrical distribution was handled by 20th Century Fox.

Critical response
Critics reacted unfavorably towards the film, with one of the common complaints being that the story was full of plot holes.  Roger Ebert wrote, "I do not understand this movie. I sat before the screen, quiet, attentive and alert, and gradually a certain anger began to stir inside me, because the movie was not holding up its side of the bargain. It was making no sense. I don't demand that all movies make sense. I sometimes enjoy movies that make no sense whatsoever, if that's their intention.  But a thriller is supposed to hold together in some sort of logical way, isn't it?'"  The Chicago Readers Dave Kehr has stated, "The structure is a mess...which ultimately makes it too difficult to tell whether its oddly compelling qualities are the result of a coherent artistic strategy or the cynical carelessness of a director sidelined." Vincent Canby of the New York Times wrote that it was "incomprehensible" and "full of gratuitous sex and violence", but "has a kind of hallucinatory craziness to it". It currently holds a 42% approval rating on Rotten Tomatoes from 19 reviews.

Home media
Thorn EMI picked up the initial video rights; a laserdisc edition was published by Image Entertainment.  It is currently available on DVD and Blu-ray from Anchor Bay Entertainment, which has included the director's cut of the film on its DVD release, but it is sourced from the only known copy in existence, a low-quality, full-screen videotape.

Alpha to Omega: Exposing The Osterman Weekend
Alpha to Omega: Exposing The Osterman Weekend is a 2004 documentary about the making of The Osterman Weekend. It was included as a special feature on Anchor Bay Entertainment's 2004 DVD release of the film. Featuring interviews with many members of the cast and crew, it not only examines the process of bringing Ludlum's novel to the screen, but also provides a portrait of Peckinpah's approach to the filmmaking process and of his frame of mind and physical health following years of substance abuse.  It was directed by Jonathan Gaines, who co-wrote it with Michael Thau, who was also the editor.Interviews:William N. Panzer
Peter S. Davis
Rutger Hauer
John Hurt
Chris Sarandon
Craig T. Nelson
Cassie Yates

Nick Redman
Meg Foster
Martin Baum
Helen Shaver
Edward Abroms
Lalo Schifrin

Remake

In February 2012, it was reported that talks were under way to film a new adaptation of Ludlum's book.

See also

 List of films featuring surveillance

ReferencesNotesBibliography'

External links

Review by Leonard Pierce
The Osterman Weekend movie stills

1983 films
1983 action films
1980s spy films
American spy films
American political thriller films
Films about the Central Intelligence Agency
Films directed by Sam Peckinpah
Films based on works by Robert Ludlum
20th Century Fox films
Films scored by Lalo Schifrin
Films produced by William N. Panzer
Cold War spy films
1980s English-language films
1980s American films